Urs Widmer (21 May 1938 – 2 April 2014) was a Swiss novelist, playwright, an essayist, and a short story writer.

Biography
Widmer was born in Basel in 1938, and for many years lived in Zurich. Widmer studied German, French, and history at the universities of Basel and Montpellier. After completing his PhD, he worked briefly as an editor at Suhrkamp Verlag, but left the publishing house during the Lektoren-Aufstand ("Editors' Revolt") of 1968.

In 2014, Roman Bucheli, Literary Editor of the Neue Zürcher Zeitung, said that Widmer:
"is without doubt one of the most significant and versatile talents currently at work in the field of contemporary German-language literature as well as one of the most successful. His sales are invariably in the high five-figure bracket"

Works in English translation
My mother's lover ("Der Geliebte meiner Mutter"). Tr. Donal McLaughlin, London, Seagull Books [2011], .
My father's book ("Das Buch des Vaters"). Tr. Donal McLaughlin, London, Seagull Books [2011], .
On life, death, and this and that of the rest. The Frankfurt lectures on poetics ("Vom Leben, vom Tod und vom Übrigen auch dies und das"). Tr. Donal McLaughlin, London, Seagull Books [2013], .
The blue soda siphon ("Der blaue Siphon"). Tr. Donal McLaughlin, London, Seagull Books [2014], .
In the Congo ("Im Kongo"). Tr. Donal McLaughlin, London, Seagull Books [2015], .
Mr Adamson ("Herr Adamson"). Tr. Donal McLaughlin, London, Seagull Books [2015], .

Awards and honors

1977 Hörspielpreis der Kriegsblinden, Fernsehabend
1992 Preis der SWR-Bestenliste
1997 Mülheimer Dramatikerpreis, Top Dogs
1998 Heimito von Doderer Prize
2001 Bertolt Brecht Literature Prize
2002 Großer Literaturpreis der Bayerischen Akademie der Schönen Künste
2013 Friedrich Hölderlin Prize

References

1938 births
2014 deaths
Swiss writers